Kesar (also Romanized as Kesār; also known as Kāsān) is a village in Pasikhan Rural District, in the Central District of Rasht County, Gilan Province, Iran. At the 2006 census, its population was 557, in 144 families.

References 

Populated places in Rasht County